Zadoc P. Beach was a member of the Wisconsin State Senate.

Biography
Beach was born on January 21, 1861, in Whitewater, Wisconsin. His professional pursuits would include cold storage, creamery and produce businesses.

Political career
Beach was member of the Senate from 1903 to 1905 representing the 23rd District. Previously, he had been a Whitewater alderman from 1888 to 1894 and Mayor of Whitewater from 1895 to 1896. He was a Republican.

References

External links
The Political Graveyard

People from Whitewater, Wisconsin
Republican Party Wisconsin state senators
Wisconsin city council members
Mayors of places in Wisconsin
Businesspeople from Wisconsin
1861 births
Year of death missing